Wesley Bell (born November 5, 1974) is an American attorney, former public defender, former municipal prosecutor and judge, former municipal prosecutor and former city council member for Ferguson, Missouri. Currently, Bell holds the office of Prosecuting Attorney for St. Louis County, Missouri. In a major upset, he soundly defeated long-time yet controversial county prosecutor Bob McCulloch in the August 2018 Democratic primary election. Bell became the first black county prosecuting attorney in St. Louis County history when he took office in January 2019.

Early life
Bell was raised in northern St. Louis County, Missouri. He is the son of a police officer father and civil servant mother. Bell is a graduate of Hazelwood East High School, Lindenwood University, and University of Missouri School of Law.

Career
After graduating from law school, Bell worked as a St. Louis County public defender. He later joined the faculty of Florissant Valley Community College as a professor in the criminology department. Additionally, he also was appointed to be a municipal court judge in Velda City and municipal prosecutor in Riverview. While working as a municipal judge in Velda City, Bell was sued by Arch City Defenders, a local nonprofit, for running an illegal bail system. In 2015 during the Ferguson Protests he was elected to the city council with strong support from some activists. During his time on the council he helped to implement the consent decree to reform the city's criminal justice system through both police and court reform.

Running for the county prosecutor race on a platform of community based policing, assigning special prosecutors in homicides by police, pledging to never seek the death penalty, reforming cash bail/bond and never using it for low-level offenses, expanding diversion programs and the county's drug courts, and promoting equitable due process, he received significant support from local and national activists and advocacy groups.

Prosecutor-elect 

In December 2018, a month before Bell took office, the St. Louis County Prosecuting Attorney Office attorneys and investigators voted to join the St. Louis Police Officers Association (SLPOA) a chapter of the Fraternal Order of Police which represents police officers in a neighboring jurisdiction. This decision elicited immediate criticism, including accusations of a conflict of interest. Concerns were raised both locally and nationally, and by the Ethical Society of Police (ESOP), which is composed of, predominantly black, active and retired law enforcement officers. However, at least some of the employees’ concerns seemed to be justified after Bell terminated three veteran prosecutors within hours of beginning his term. These terminated employees were later paid $170,000 by St. Louis County to settle their wrongful termination claims.

County prosecutor

Bell Plan

On January 8, 2019, Bell released details of his "Bell Plan". This plan prioritized working to reduce the St. Louis County jail population to give more resources to combating violent crime.

Marijuana decriminalization

In his first hours in office, Bell ordered his assistant prosecutors not to prosecute marijuana cases under 100 grams without evidence of distribution of the drug.  However, he will still prosecute marijuana cases where the person possessing the marijuana is armed with a weapon. They will also not seek warrants on cases which solely involve the possession of marijuana.

Child support

Additionally, during his first days in office Bell elected to stop prosecuting criminal child support cases. This led to concerns that he was allowing non-supporting parents to evade their financial obligations to their children. Bell responded that he was trying to ensure that people would not face criminal charges for being unable to pay and that such charges made it harder for debtors to pay their child support. Bell also stated that he was bringing St. Louis County into line with the rest of the State of Missouri. At the same time it emerged that Tim Swope, Bell's Director of Operations, owed nearly $19,000.00 in back child support himself.

Death penalty

Bell campaigned on a platform of opposition to the death penalty.  In November 2018, prior to Bell taking office, Thomas Bruce, a resident of Jefferson County, Missouri, allegedly entered Catholic Supply, a religious goods store in west St. Louis County and ordered three women there to perform deviant sexual acts on him. According to the charges, when one of the women refused to do so he shot her in the head, killing her. There was a major public outcry for Bell seek the death penalty for Bruce, but Bell refused, keeping his campaign promise. Former St. Louis police chief Tim Fitch has urged Bell to turn the case over to federal prosecutors so that they can seek the death penalty. However, the family of the victim supported Bell's decision not to seek the death penalty.

Officer-involved shootings

In April 2019, police with the city of Ladue, a St. Louis municipality, were called to a disturbance at a local grocery store. The disturbance allegedly involved a woman shoplifting and fighting with store employees. The Ladue police officer, a white female, confronted the alleged shoplifter, a black female, and the woman fought with the officer and ran from her. The police officer then shot her, claiming she intended to use her taser instead. Bell, reversing the trend over the past several years, charged the police officer with felony assault in the second degree.

However, in another case in August 2019, at the St. Louis Galleria Mall, a man named Terry Tillman was shot and killed after being chased by a police officer. According to police, Tillman was carrying a pistol with an extended magazine inside the mall, a no-gun zone. Police also said that a shopper alerted a police officer who went to stop Tillman. When approached, Tillman took off and the officer chased him. During this chase several other police officers joined the pursuit which took Tillman and officers onto an adjacent parking lot. At some point Tillman was shot after police said he allegedly made a threatening movement in their direction. However, activists in St. Louis later claimed the police planted the gun on Tillman after shooting him and that shooting Tillman was an extreme overreaction on the part of police. Bell was one of the first people at the scene and promised a transparent investigation. However, after nearly a year and a half, in December 2020, Bell announced he would not charge the officer. Bell blamed the delay on being unable to obtain video due to the COVID-19 pandemic. However, a police report released by Bell's office indicated that Bell's office had the video on November 29, 2019.

Controversies

Reopening the Michael Brown shooting case

After his win against incumbent Bob McCulloch, many of his supporters, including Howard University law professor Justin Hansford, called on Bell to reopen the investigation into the death of Michael Brown. While Bell initially promised to address the issue before his inauguration, it took him nearly 18 months to do so. Bell ultimately found, like his predecessor Bob McCulloch and the Obama DOJ, that there was no probable cause to charge Darren Wilson with murder or manslaughter. This decision was met with anger from his supporters and Michael Brown's family who accused Bell of conducting an incomplete investigation. The St. Louis Post Dispatch, a local paper of record, was also critical of Bell for his apparent disappointment, expressed at a press conference, in not being able to indict Wilson.

Sex discrimination lawsuit

On October 29, 2020, one of Bell's assistant prosecutors filed a lawsuit under Missouri's Human Rights Act claiming that Bell had fired her and forced out five other female attorneys in favor of male employees. The lawsuit further alleged that Bell had created a hostile work environment for female attorneys at the office. Bell responded by claiming that the prosecutor's attorney was irresponsibly and unethically attempting to litigate his case in the media.

Allegations of politically-motivated prosecutions

In October 2019, Bell charged Dawan Ferguson with two counts of statutory rape and two counts of statutory sodomy and child molestation. The allegations stem from the disappearance of Ferguson's son Christian in 2003. Ferguson's public defender filed a motion to dismiss the case, arguing that the case was politically-motivated.  She cited Ferguson's ex-wife working for Bell's campaign for prosecutor and donating money to Bell as proof of this assertion.

In July 2022, Dawan Ferguson was convicted of the murder charges for his son.

Use of government resources

Bell has also been criticized for his use of government resources while in office.  In June 2019, KSDK, a local news outlet, reported that Bell had amassed nearly $800 in parking tickets for parking in no-parking zones and in front of fire hydrants outside of his office, despite the fact that he was provided with a parking space. Bell's chief of staff, Sam Alton, responded that it was "too tedious" to cross the street to the parking garage. Bell later paid off the parking tickets using his own money.

In August 2019, it emerged that Bell had hired a former campaign worker as a paid intern with the office. In that position she earned more than many of the career staff employees and legal interns. While Bell refused to be interviewed about the subject, his office responded that she was responsible for community engagement projects. The intern was also observed accompanying Bell to many social and community events.

In October 2019, the St. Louis Post-Dispatch conducted an investigation into Bell's expenditures during the first ten months in office. The investigation uncovered that Bell had spent over $30,000 in government funds on travel and food during his first ten months in office. This included an $816 dinner at an expensive Miami steakhouse and a $300 meal at a Lake of the Ozarks steakhouse. In addition to food and travel, the Post-Dispatch determined that Bell had spent over $8,000 of taxpayer dollars on new office furniture, blinds, and an espresso machine for his office. Furthermore, the Post-Dispatch also reported on Bell's efforts to hide details of his spending, such as omitting thousands of dollars of charges from requested records, charging the Post to provide requested documents, reimbursing expenditures only after records requests for those expenditures were made, and being nonresponsive to sunshine requests. This was criticized as inconsistent with Bell's campaign promises to be a transparent administration. Under pressure from his supporters, Bell ultimately apologized for this scandal and vowed to spend taxpayer money more appropriately in the future.

References

External links

1974 births
Living people
Lawyers from St. Louis
Politicians from St. Louis
Politicians from St. Louis County, Missouri
American prosecutors
Public defenders
Missouri Democrats
Missouri lawyers
African-American lawyers
African-American men in politics
Shooting of Michael Brown
Lindenwood University alumni
University of Missouri School of Law alumni
20th-century American lawyers
21st-century American lawyers
21st-century African-American politicians
21st-century American politicians